Linda J. Lopez (born September 10, 1948) is a Democratic former member of the Arizona Senate, representing the 29th District from 2009 to 2014. Lopez served in the Arizona House of Representatives from 2001 to 2009. She was the Assistant Minority Leader in the Senate.

Lopez resigned in January 2014.

References

External links

 Arizona State Senate – Sen. Linda Lopez – Official Arizona Senate Site
 Linda Lopez – official campaign website
 Project Vote Smart – Senator Linda J. Lopez (AZ) profile
 Follow the Money – Linda Lopez
 2006 2004 2002 2000 campaign contributions

Democratic Party members of the Arizona House of Representatives
1948 births
Living people
Women state legislators in Arizona
Democratic Party Arizona state senators
Politicians from Tucson, Arizona
21st-century American politicians
21st-century American women politicians
People from Logansport, Indiana